Alvin Jerome Mitchell (born August 20, 1964) is a former American football fullback who played one season with the Tampa Bay Buccaneers of the National Football League. He played college football at Auburn University and attended Venice High School in Venice, Florida.

College career
Mitchell played for the Auburn Tigers as a linebacker, recording 121 career tackles.

Professional career
Mitchell signed with the Tampa Bay Buccaneers as a fullback on May 1, 1989 and spent the first eleven games of the 1989 season on the practice squad. He was then promoted to the active roster and played in the final five games of the season. He was released by the Buccaneers on August 20, 1990.

Personal life
Mitchell has worked as a minister and policeman.

References

External links
Just Sports Stats

Living people
1964 births
Players of American football from Florida
American football fullbacks
American football linebackers
African-American players of American football
Auburn Tigers football players
Tampa Bay Buccaneers players
African-American police officers
American police officers
People from Venice, Florida
21st-century African-American people
20th-century African-American sportspeople